Conservation is the preservation or efficient use of resources, or the conservation of various quantities under physical laws.

Conservation may also refer to:

Environment and natural resources 
 Nature conservation, the protection and management of the environment and natural resources
Wetland conservation,  protecting and preserving areas where water exists at or near the Earth's surface, such as swamps, marshes and bogs.
 Conservation biology, the science of protection and management of biodiversity
 Conservation movement, political, environmental, or social movement that seeks to protect natural resources, including biodiversity and habitat
 Conservation organization, an organization dedicated to protection and management of the environment or natural resources
 Wildlife conservation, the practice of protecting wild species and their habitats in order to prevent species from going extinct
 Conservation (magazine), published by the Society for Conservation Biology from 2000 to 2014
 Conservation Biology (journal), scientific journal of the Society for Conservation Biology

Physical laws 
 Conservation law, principle that a particular measurable property of an isolated physical system does not change as the system evolves over time
 Conservation of energy, principle that the total energy of an isolated system remains constant over time
 Conservation of mass, principle that the mass of any closed system must remain constant over time
 Conservation of linear momentum, principle that the total momentum of a closed system is constant
 Conservation of angular momentum, principle that total angular momentum of a system is constant
 Charge conservation, principle that the total electric charge in an isolated system never changes

Land designated for conservation 
 Conservation area (United Kingdom), an area considered worthy of preservation because of its architectural or historic interest
 Conservation designation, the status of an area of land in terms of conservation or protection
 Conservation district, government entities that help manage and protect land and water resources in U.S. states and insular areas
 Conservation easement, a power of an organization to constrain the exercise of rights otherwise held by a landowner to achieve certain conservation purposes
 Conservation community, a community committed to saving large parcels of land from ecological degradation

Other uses 
 Conservation (psychology), learning development of logical thinking, according to Jean Piaget 
 Conservation and restoration of cultural property, the conservation or restoration of cultural heritage
 Conservation and restoration of immovable cultural property
 Conservation science (cultural property), the interdisciplinary study of conservation of cultural works

See also 
 
 
 Conservation ministry (disambiguation)
 Conversation (disambiguation)
 Conservation science (disambiguation)
 Conservatism (disambiguation)
 Conserve (disambiguation)
 Conserved quantity, in mathematics, a function of dependent variables that remains constant
 Conserved sequence, similar or identical sequences of nucleic acids, proteins, protein structures, or polymeric carbohydrates
 Preservation (disambiguation)
 Sustainable forest management
 Wildlife management, management to conserve wild species and their habitats